__notoc__

Cassini's identity (sometimes called Simson's identity) and Catalan's identity are mathematical identities for the Fibonacci numbers. Cassini's identity, a special case of Catalan's identity, states that for the nth Fibonacci number,

Catalan's identity generalizes this:

Vajda's identity generalizes this:

History
Cassini's formula was discovered in 1680 by Giovanni Domenico Cassini, then director of the Paris Observatory, and independently proven by Robert Simson (1753). However Johannes Kepler presumably knew the identity already in 1608. Eugène Charles Catalan found the identity named after him in 1879. The British mathematician Steven Vajda (1901–95) published a book on Fibonacci numbers (Fibonacci and Lucas Numbers, and the Golden Section: Theory and Applications, 1989) which contains the identity carrying his name. However the identity was already published in 1960 by Dustan Everman as problem 1396 in The American Mathematical Monthly.

Proof of Cassini identity

Proof by matrix theory
A quick proof of Cassini's identity may be given  by recognising the left side of the equation as a determinant of a 2×2 matrix of Fibonacci numbers. The result is almost immediate when the matrix is seen to be the th power of a matrix with determinant −1:

Proof by induction

Consider the induction statement:

The base case  is true.

Then: 

so the statement is true for all integers .

Proof of Catalan identity

So,

Using ,

Because 

Cancelling the 's gives the result.

Notes

References

External links
Proof of Cassini's identity
Proof of Catalan's Identity
Cassini formula for Fibonacci numbers
Fibonacci and Phi Formulae

Mathematical identities
Fibonacci numbers
Articles containing proofs
Giovanni Domenico Cassini